Daniel S. Kreider (born March 11, 1977) is a former American football fullback. He was signed by the Pittsburgh Steelers as an undrafted free agent in 2000. He played college football at New Hampshire.

Kreider earned a Super Bowl ring with the Steelers in Super Bowl XL, defeating the Seattle Seahawks. He has also played for the St. Louis Rams and Arizona Cardinals.

College career
Kreider earned state Section II Best Player honors as a senior at Manheim, Pennsylvania's Manheim Central High School. He attended the University of New Hampshire and was an A student and letterman in football. In football, he was a three-year starter at fullback, and as a senior, he posted 92 rushing attempts for 518 yards (5.6 yards per rushing attempt avg.), and 25 receptions for 275 yards (11.00 yards per reception avg.) and a touchdown. He majored in business administration.

Professional career

Pittsburgh Steelers

Kreider entered the league when the Steelers signed him as an undrafted free agent following the 2000 NFL Draft. After playing on the team's practice squad, he was signed to the active roster on October 17, 2000, to replace Jon Witman, who had been injured. He remained on the active roster for the remainder of the season and was named the Steelers' Rookie of the Year, playing better than draftees Plaxico Burress and Marvel Smith. Starting at fullback in Super Bowl XL vs Seattle, Kreider threw a key block for quarterback Ben Roethlisberger on a one-yard touchdown run in the second quarter to give the Steelers a 7-3 lead.

It was announced on September 7, 2007 that there may be some games during the 2007 season that Kreider may not even dress. It was also announced at the same time that he would not be the starting fullback, but rather Carey Davis would assume that role for at least the first game. After tearing his ACL in week 12 against the Miami Dolphins, he was placed on season-ending injured reserve on November 29.

St. Louis Rams
On July 22, 2008 Kreider was signed by the St. Louis Rams but later released on November 23, 2008 . Kreider was the Rams' starting fullback and played in all 11 games that he was on the team for. He had one carry for 0 yards. Kreider wore 36 for the Rams which was the same number worn by Jerome Bettis when he played for the Rams. Bettis played his first three seasons with the Rams before being traded to the Steelers. Kreider had previously worn 35.

Arizona Cardinals
Kreider signed a one-year contract with the Arizona Cardinals on April 2, 2009. The move reunited him with Cardinals Head Coach Ken Whisenhunt, who had previously been the offensive coordinator for the Steelers during Kreider's time in Pittsburgh.

References

External links
Arizona Cardinals bio
Pittsburgh Steelers bio
St. Louis Rams bio

1977 births
Living people
Sportspeople from Lancaster, Pennsylvania
Players of American football from Pennsylvania
American football fullbacks
New Hampshire Wildcats football players
Pittsburgh Steelers players
St. Louis Rams players
Arizona Cardinals players
People from Manheim, Pennsylvania